York South—Weston is a federal electoral district in Ontario, Canada, that has been represented in the House of Commons of Canada since 1979.

In 2015, York South—Weston elected Canada's first MP of Somali descent, Ahmed Hussen.

Electoral district
Located in the west-end of Toronto, the riding is made up largely of the old City of York, a southwestern portion of the old city of North York, and parts of the old city of Toronto north of High Park. A sizeable portion of the land in the western part of the riding which was previously part of the old City of York was the old village of Weston until that village was absorbed into the City of York in 1968. The riding has a largely working class and immigrant population. 

Its geographic boundaries are the part of the City of Toronto bounded by a line drawn from Humber River east along Highway 401, south along the Canadian National Railway situated west of Caledonia Road, west along Rogers Road, southeast along Old Weston Road, west along Lavender Road, south along Keele Street, southeast along the Canadian National/Canadian Pacific Railway, west along the Canadian Pacific Railway, and north along the Humber River to Highway 401.

Former boundaries
York South—Weston was created in 1976 from parts of York South, York West, Davenport, High Park—Humber Valley, and Etobicoke ridings.

Its new boundaries were originally of the part of Metropolitan Toronto bounded by a line drawn from Eglinton Avenue West north along Keele Street, west along Lawrence Avenue West, south along the Humber River, east and north along the north limit of the City of Toronto, south along Runnymede Road, east along Annette Street, south along Keele Street, east along Humberside Avenue, northwest along the Canadian National Railway, east along the north limit of the City of Toronto, north along the east side of Prospect Cemetery, and west along Eglinton Avenue West to Keele Street.

In 1987, York South—Weston was redefined to consist of the parts of the cities of North York, Toronto and York bounded by a line drawn from the western limit of the City of North York east along Highway 401, south along Keele Street, west along Eglinton Avenue West, south along Keele Street, west along the southern limit of the City of York, southeast along the Canadian National Railway line, west along Dupont Street, northwest along Dundas Street West, west along Annette Street, north along Runnymede Road, west along the Canadian Pacific Railway line, and north along the western limits of the Cities of York and North York to Highway 401.

In 1996, it was redefined to consist of the parts of the cities of North York, Toronto and York bounded by a line drawn from the western limit of the City of North York east along Highway 401, southeast along the Canadian National Railway situated immediately west of Caledonia Road, west along Rogers Road, south along Old Weston Road, west along the northern limit of the City of Toronto, southeast along the Canadian National Railway, west along the Canadian Pacific Railway, and north along the western limit of the cities of York and North York to Highway 401.

In 2003, it was given its current boundaries as described above. This riding was unchanged during the 2012 electoral redistribution.

Demographics

''According to the Canada 2021 Census; 2013 representation

Languages: 49% English, 9.8% Portuguese, 7.2% Spanish, 4.8% Italian, 3.2% Tagalog, 3.1% Vietnamese, 2.1% Somali, 1% Yue
Religions: 65.9% Christian (41.2% Catholic, 2.8% Pentecostal, 2.3% Christian Orthodox, 1.7% Anglican, 1% Baptist), 18.5% No religion, 8.7% Muslim, 3% Buddhist, 2.6% Hindu
Median income (2020): $34,400 
Average income (2020): $43,360

Ethnicity groups: White: 41.2%, Black: 24%, Latin American: 9.1%, Filipino: 6.8%, South Asian: 5.7%, Southeast Asian 4.6%, Chinese: 1.9%

Ethnic origins: Portuguese 12.2%, Italian 11%, Filipino: 6.2%, Canadian 6%, Jamaican 5.1%, English 4.4%, African 4.2%, Vietnamese 4.2%, Irish 4%, Scottish 3.6%

Members of Parliament

This riding has elected the following members of the House of Commons of Canada:

Election results

		

			
				

Note: Canadian Alliance vote is compared to the Reform vote in 1997 election.

Toronto Council Wards 11 and 12

Etobicoke North is also the name for two wards on Toronto City Council each represented by a city councillor:

(Ward 11) York South - Weston - current councillor Frances Nunziata
(Ward 12) York South - Weston - current councillor Frank Di Giorgio

The combined ward boundaries roughly corresponds to the federal electoral district.

See also
 List of Canadian federal electoral districts
 Past Canadian electoral districts

References

Notes

External links
York South-Weston history from the Parliament of Canada website includes election results and evolving boundary descriptions.
 2011 results from Elections Canada
 Campaign expense data from Elections Canada

Federal electoral districts of Toronto
North York
Ontario federal electoral districts
1976 establishments in Ontario